Kraftkar is a blue cheese from Tingvoll in Nordmøre, Western Norway, made from unskimmed cow's milk and cream, with injected culture of the mold Penicillium roqueforti.

The name Kraftkar ("strongman") relates to the legendary farmhand Tore Nordbø and his supernatural strength and size.

History
Produced by the cheesemaker Tingvollost, Kraftkar was first introduced in 2004.

Awards
Kraftkar was awarded gold medal for blue cheese at the World Cheese Awards in 2011, gold medal at the International Cheese Awards in 2013, and silver medal at the 2015 World Cheese Awards. At the 2016 World Cheese Awards in San Sebastián, Kraftkar was selected "World Champion" (all categories), among more than 3,000 participating cheeses from 35 countries.

See also
 List of cheeses

References

Cow's-milk cheeses
Norwegian cheeses
Blue cheeses